Fiesta is the fourth studio album by Swedish Eurodance artist Jonny Jakobsen and his first album under the pseudonym Carlito. It was released on 12 July 2006.

The album has a satirical ethnic theme, blending elements of Mexican mariachi with a Eurodance sound. The reworked musical style, including the addition of female backing vocalists and inclusion of more acoustic elements, has been largely successful with the fans of Jakobsen's other work.

Track listing
The following tracks were featured on the original CD release:
Carlito (¿Who's That Boy?) – 3:16
Taco Boy – 3:05
Poco Loco – 3:22
Casa De Carlito – 3:36
El Camino – 3:51
Adios Amigo – 3:24
Alarma Caramba! – 3:07
I Like It – 3:06
Vacaciones – 3:25
My Salsa – 3:04
Manana – 2:53
Fiesta Night – 3:04

The Ultimate Collection
On 15 November 2006, a special CD-DVD combo edition of the album, entitled The Ultimate Collection was released in Japan exclusively. The DVD content included music videos for the tracks Poco Loco and Go Go Carlito, two TV spots and a four-part animated feature entitled Carlito The Movie.

The CD features the following bonus tracks:
Christmas Fiesta – 3:35  	
Carlito (¿Who's That Boy?) (Christmas Mix) – 3:18 	
Carlito (¿Who's That Boy?) (F. Factory Latin Mix) – 7:19 	
Carlito (¿Who's That Boy?) (F. Factory Trance Mix) – 6:50 	
Carlito (¿Who's That Boy?) (Eurobeat Mix) – 4:28 	
Carlito (¿Who's That Boy?) ("HBS" Mix) – 4:09 	
Carlito (¿Who's That Boy?) (Myxx-Up Future Latin Mix) – 4:03 	
Carlito (¿Who's That Boy?) (Karaoke Version) – 3:18

References

External links
Carlito on Bubblegum Dancer
Official Carlito website

2006 albums
2006 video albums
Jonny Jakobsen albums
Warner Records albums
Warner Records video albums